Le Cordon Bleu College of Culinary Arts- Scottsdale formerly Scottsdale Culinary Institute (SCI) was a career-focused school in Arizona specializing in culinary and hospitality education. Elizabeth Sherman Leite started Scottsdale Culinary Institute in 1986. The college is owned by Career Education Corporation under a licensing agreement with Le Cordon Bleu in Paris. The institute was located in a former country club on a golf course and lakefront overlooking Camelback Mountain. It closed in 2017.

History
The school, generally known as the Scottsdale Culinary Institute was one of the largest culinary programs in the area. It was founded by Elizabeth Leite in 1986 and under Jon-Paul Hutchins, more than one hundred thousand students went through the program in twenty five years and earned associates or bachelor's degrees. It closed in 2017 along with the remaining Cordon Bleu schools in the United States.

Notable faculty and alumni
Kevin Binkley, James Beard winner 
Stephanie Izard, winner of Top Chef, Season 4
Bernie Kantak
Fife Symington, former governor of Arizona

References

External links
 Scottsdale Culinary Institute website

Defunct private universities and colleges in Arizona
Cooking schools in the United States
Educational institutions established in 1986
Buildings and structures in Scottsdale, Arizona
Education in Scottsdale, Arizona
Universities and colleges in Maricopa County, Arizona
1986 establishments in Arizona
Career Education Corporation
Educational institutions disestablished in 2017
2017 disestablishments in Arizona